Ponca is a genus of crickets in the family Gryllidae.

References

Crickets
Taxa described in 1928
Ensifera genera